An Lão is a township and capital of An Lão District, Haiphong, Vietnam.

References

Populated places in Haiphong
District capitals in Vietnam
Townships in Vietnam